Bahattin Berke Demircan (born 25 November 2002) is a Turkish footballer who plays as a forward for TFF Second League club Isparta 32 SK on loan from Fatih Karagümrük.

Career
Demircan began his career with Tuzlaspor, before moving to Fatih Karagümrük in the summer of 2021. He made his professional debut with Fatih Karagümrük in a 1–1 Süper Lig tie with Alanyaspor on 26 December 2021.

References

External links
 

2002 births
Living people
Footballers from Istanbul
Turkish footballers
Association football forwards
Tuzlaspor players
Fatih Karagümrük S.K. footballers
Süper Lig players
TFF First League players
TFF Second League players